Ohtamış is a village in the Ulubey district of Ordu Province, Turkey. The village is approximately 21 km south of the Black Sea. The village had a population of 1,570 as of 2000.

The Ohtamış Waterfall is located nearby Ohtamış.

References

Villages in Ordu Province
Ulubey District